In dynamical systems theory, Conley index theory, named after Charles Conley, analyzes topological structure of invariant sets of diffeomorphisms and of smooth flows. It is a far-reaching generalization of the Hopf index theorem that predicts existence of fixed points of a flow inside a planar region in terms of information about its behavior on the boundary. Conley's theory is related to Morse theory, which describes the topological structure of a closed manifold by means of a nondegenerate gradient vector field. It has an enormous range of applications to the study of dynamics, including existence of periodic orbits in Hamiltonian systems and travelling wave solutions for partial differential equations, structure of global attractors for reaction–diffusion equations and delay differential equations, proof of chaotic behavior in dynamical systems, and bifurcation theory. Conley index theory formed the basis for development of Floer homology.

Short description 
A key role in the theory is played by the notions of isolating neighborhood  and isolated invariant set . In the special case of the negative gradient flow of a smooth function, the Conley index of a nondegenerate (Morse) critical point of index  is the pointed homotopy type of the k-sphere Sk.

A deep theorem due to Conley asserts continuation invariance: Conley index is invariant under certain deformations of the dynamical system. Computation of the index can, therefore, be reduced to the case of the diffeomorphism or a vector field whose invariant sets are well understood. 

If the index is nontrivial then the invariant set S is nonempty. This principle can be amplified to establish existence of fixed points and periodic orbits inside N.

Construction 
We build the Conley Index from the concept of a index pair.

Conley shows that every isolating invariant set admits an index pair.

,

the homotopy type of the quotient space , seen as a topological pointed space.

.

We remark that also Conley showed that the Conley index is independent of the choice of an index pair, so that the index is well defined.

Properties

Some of the most important properties of the index are direct consequences of its definition, inheriting properties from homology and homotopy. Some of them include the following:

 If , then ;

 If , where each  is an isolated invariant set, then ;

 The Conley index is homotopy invariant.

Notice that, a Morse set is an isolated invariant set, so that the conley index is defined for it.

References 
 Charles Conley, Isolated invariant sets and the Morse index. CBMS Regional Conference Series in Mathematics, 38. American Mathematical Society, Providence, R.I., 1978   
 
 John Franks, Michal Misiurewicz, Topological methods in dynamics. Chapter 7 in Handbook of Dynamical Systems, vol 1, part 1, pp 547–598, Elsevier 2002 
 Jürgen Jost, Dynamical systems. Examples of complex behaviour. Universitext. Springer-Verlag, Berlin, 2005 
 Konstantin Mischaikow, Marian Mrozek, Conley index. Chapter 9 in Handbook of Dynamical Systems, vol 2, pp 393–460, Elsevier 2002 
 M. R. Razvan, On Conley’s fundamental theorem of dynamical systems, 2002.

External links
 Separation of Topological Singularities (Wolfram Demonstrations Project)

Differential topology
Topological dynamics
Fixed points (mathematics)